The nineteenth season of Saturday Night Live, an American sketch comedy series, originally aired in the United States on NBC between September 25, 1993, and May 14, 1994.

Cast
Many changes happened before the start of the season.

Dana Carvey had left the show in the middle of the previous season. Chris Rock and Robert Smigel also left the show at the end of the previous season. Ellen Cleghorne, Melanie Hutsell, Tim Meadows, Adam Sandler, and David Spade were all promoted to repertory status. Stand-up comics Norm Macdonald, Jay Mohr and Sarah Silverman were hired as writers and would debut as featured players, a few episodes into the season. Veteran comic actor Michael McKean joined the show mid-season as a repertory cast member. At age 46, McKean was the oldest person to join the cast of the show, a distinction he held until Leslie Jones became a cast member (at age 47) in 2014. 

This would be the final season for longtime cast members Phil Hartman, Rob Schneider, Julia Sweeney and Melanie Hutsell. This was also the only season for Sarah Silverman. 

A major blow for the show was the loss of Hartman. Before his final show the entire cast and crew presented him with a bronzed stick of glue, symbolizing how he had become "The Glue" of the show, a term coined by Adam Sandler.

This was the final season to show StereoSurround captioning during the opening montage.

This is also the first season to feature the show returning to the original "repertory" and "featured" cast lists since season 15.

Cast roster

Repertory players
Ellen Cleghorne
Chris Farley
Phil Hartman
Melanie Hutsell
Michael McKean (first episode: March 12, 1994)
Tim Meadows
Mike Myers
Kevin Nealon
Adam Sandler
Rob Schneider
David Spade
Julia Sweeney

Featured players
Al Franken
Norm Macdonald (first episode: October 2, 1993)
Jay Mohr (first episode: October 9, 1993)
Sarah Silverman (first episode: October 9, 1993)

bold denotes Weekend Update anchor

Writers

Episodes

Specials

Wayne's World 2 film
Wayne's World 2, the sequel to the 1992 hit Wayne's World, was released on December 10, 1993. Based on the popular "Wayne's World" sketches, the film stars cast members Dana Carvey, Chris Farley, Tim Meadows, Mike Myers and Harry Shearer. SNL writers Bob Odenkirk and Robert Smigel have brief cameos as concert nerds. The film did not do as well at the box office as its predecessor, grossing less than half of what the original did. It received generally positive reviews from critics, with Roger Ebert calling the characters of Wayne and Garth "impossible to dislike".

It's Pat film
It's Pat, a film based on the popular Pat sketches, was released on August 26, 1994. Cast members Tim Meadows, Charles Rocket and Julia Sweeney appear in the film. The film was a box office bomb, barely making $50,000. The film was also panned by critics and has a rare 0% rating on Rotten Tomatoes, based on 11 reviews.

References

19
Saturday Night Live in the 1990s
1993 American television seasons
1994 American television seasons